Policarpio Calizaya Huaca (born September 10, 1962) is a retired long-distance runner from Bolivia, who represented his native country in three consecutive Summer Olympics, starting in 1988. He was the oldest member at the 1996 Summer Olympics for Bolivia, and carried the flag at the opening ceremony.

Achievements

References

1962 births
Living people
Bolivian male marathon runners
Athletes (track and field) at the 1988 Summer Olympics
Athletes (track and field) at the 1992 Summer Olympics
Athletes (track and field) at the 1996 Summer Olympics
Olympic athletes of Bolivia
Athletes (track and field) at the 1991 Pan American Games
Athletes (track and field) at the 1995 Pan American Games
Pan American Games competitors for Bolivia